"The Dark End of the Street" is a 1967 soul song written by songwriters Dan Penn and Chips Moman.

The Dark End of the Street may refer to:
Dark End of the Street (Moving Hearts album), a 1982 album by Irish folk rock band Moving Hearts
Dark End of the Street (EP), a 2008 EP album by American singer/songwriter Chan Marshall, also known as Cat Power
At the Dark End of the Street: Black Women, Rape, and Resistance--A New History of the Civil Rights Movement from Rosa Parks to the Rise of Black Power by Danielle L. McGuire